Cavineña is an indigenous language spoken on the Amazonian plains of northern Bolivia by over 1,000 Cavineño people. Although Cavineña is still spoken (and still learned by some children), it is an endangered language.  Guillaume (2004) states that about 1200 people speak the language, out of a population of around 1700.  Nearly all Cavineña are bilingual in Spanish.

The Cavineño people live in several communities near the Beni River, which flows north from the Andes.  The nearest towns are Reyes (to the south) and Riberalta (to the north).

Phonology
Cavineña has the following consonants (Guillaume 2004:27).  Where the practical orthography is different from IPA, it is shown between angled brackets:

It has the following vowels

Examples in the morphology and syntax sections are written in the practical orthography.

Morphology

Verbs
Verbs do not show agreement with their arguments, but are inflected for tense, aspect, mood, negation, and aktionsart, among other categories.   There are six tense/aspect/mood affixes (Guillaume 2004):

-ya 'imperfective' (for present, generic, habitual, and near future events)
-wa 'perfective' (for events that occurred earlier the same day)
-chine 'recent past' (for events that occurred between a day and a year ago)
-kware 'remote past' (for events that occurred a year or more ago)
-buke 'remote future' (for events far in the future)
e-...-u 'potential' (for events that are contingent on other events)

The following examples show the remote past and perfective affixes:

Aktionsart suffixes include:

-tere/tirya 'completive'
-bisha 'incompletive'
-nuka 'repeated/reiterative'

The following examples show the completive and reiterative suffixes:

Cavineña is the first language in the Amazon for which an antipassive voice has been described.

Syntax

Nouns and noun phrases

Subtypes of nouns
There are three subtypes of nouns in Cavineña (Guillaume 2004:71-73).
 e-nouns, which are a closed class of about 100 to 150 terms which must take a prefix e-.  (The prefix is realised as y- before the vowel a).
 kinship nouns, which are a small class of about 30 terms which are obligatorily inflected for their possessor.
 independent nouns, which are an open class of a couple of thousand terms. Independent nouns do not take any e- prefix nor any possessor inflections.

Case marking
Case marking on noun phrases is shown through a set of clitic postpositions, including the following:
=ra 'ergative case'
=tsewe 'associative case' (= English 'with')
=ja 'dative case'
=ja 'genitive case'
=ju 'locative case'

The dative and genitive cases are homophonous.

Pronouns (independent or bound) also show these case distinctions.

The following example (Guillame 2004:526) shows several of the case markers in context:

(Guillaume 2004:599)

Order in noun phrases
Noun phrases show the order (Relative Clause)-(Quantifier)-(Possessor)-Noun-(Adjective)-(Plural marker)-(Relative clause) (Guillaume 2004:69).  The following examples show some of these orders.

(The clitic =ke 'ligature' appears at the end of a relative clause.)

Pronouns
Pronouns in Cavineña can appear in either independent or bound forms.   The two kinds of pronouns are pronounced almost exactly the same, but the bound pronouns appear in second position, after the first word of the sentence. Independent pronouns tend to be contrastive, and usually appear first in the sentence.

The following pronouns are found:

Guillaume (2004:597) notes that the formative suffix -ke (of singular absolutive bound pronouns) and the ergative suffix -ra (in ergative bound pronouns) do not show up when absolutive or ergative pronouns occur last among the second position clitics.

Sentences
Cavineña has ergative case marking on the subject of a transitive verb (Guillaume 2004:527). For sentences with a non-pronominal subject, this is shown with an ergative case clitic /=ra/:

For a sentence with a pronominal subject, there are distinct ergative and absolutive forms of the pronouns:

Verbs do not inflect for the person of the subject or other arguments in the clause.  Instead, a set of clitic pronouns occurs in the second position of the clause, as in the following examples (Guillaume 2004:595):

The clitics are ordered so that 3rd person pronouns precede 2nd person pronouns, which precede 1st person pronouns.  (Some of the clitic pronouns in these examples have a formative element /-ke/ after them and some do not.)

References

Bibliography
Camp, Elizabeth, L. 1985. ‘Split ergativity in Cavineña’, International Journal of American Linguistics, 51.1: 38-58.
Camp, Elizabeth, L. and Millicent R. Liccardi. 1978. Necabahuityatira Isaraisara Huenehuene. (Aprendamos a Leer y Escribir), Cochabamba: Instituto Lingüístico de Verano. (Revised edition.)
Guillaume, Antoine. 2004. A grammar of Cavineña. Ph.D. thesis, La Trobe University.

External links
 Lenguas de Bolivia (online edition)
 Cavineña (Intercontinental Dictionary Series)

Languages of Bolivia
Tacanan languages
Endangered indigenous languages of the Americas